The Malay Film Productions (MFP), also known as the Shaw Studio, is a former film studio located on Jalan Ampas in Balestier, Singapore. The studio operated from 1947 to 1969 with more than 150 movies produced, and was a major contributor to the Golden Age of Malay Cinema. Many of the films are critically acclaimed, a significant number of which involved P. Ramlee as actor, director, writer or composer.

The following is an incomplete list of films produced by MFP (1947–1969). Also included are early Malay films (1937–1941) produced under the Shaw Brothers banner before they formed MFP.

References 

Malay Film Productions films
Malay Film Productions
Films shot in Singapore
Lists of Singaporean films